The Burnelli CB-16, also known as the Uppercu-Burnelli CB-300, was a passenger aircraft designed by the American company Burnelli in 1928. It was the first twin-engined aircraft to have retractable landing gear.  Only one was built.

Design and development

The CB-16 was built for and financed by Paul W. Chapman, chairman of Sky Lines Inc. in 1928, following the success of the Burnelli RB-2.

The CB-16 was a twin-engined high-wing monoplane, constructed of metal.  The slightly tapered wing was braced from the lower fuselage by pairs of parallel struts.  The fuselage was 36 ft (11 m) long and 12 ft (3.7 m wide) wide externally, with an airfoil cross section.  As with the earlier RB-1 and RB-2, the twin engines were embedded within the leading edge of the fuselage though, unlike them, the rest of this surface was largely filled with radiators. To reduce yaw after an engine failure, the 500 hp (370 kW) water cooled Curtiss Conqueror inline engines were mounted with slight toe out.  The internal dimensions of the cabin, which could seat 12-20 passengers, were 18 ft (5.49 m) by 11 ft 4 in (3.45 m) long, with a height of 5 ft 6 in (1.71 m). This provided both seating and lounge space.  At the rear of the cabin there was a small kitchen and toilets.  The pilots sat in open cockpits placed at the wing leading edge.

Earlier Burnelli lifting body designs had fuselages which were rectangular in plan, with the empennage directly attached, but the CB-16's fuselage tapered and the tail unit was mounted beyond the lifting body's trailing edge on a pair of thin panels extending from its sides. The alteration was motivated by the difficulties of pitch and yaw control encountered with the earlier arrangement.  The panels swept upwards into a pair of fins and balanced rudders carrying a high set tailplane with three balanced elevators, the rudders working between them. The single wheels of the still novel retracting undercarriage were mounted on V-struts hinged at the lower, outer fuselage, retracting inwards.

The completed aircraft was shipped to Newark, New Jersey. In January 1929 Leigh Wade piloted the aircraft on a 40-minute test flight. Further tests were then conducted at Curtiss Field at Long Island and Bolling Field in Washington. In 1929, during a test, the CB-16 stalled and crashed at takeoff, though the two pilots survived.

Specifications

Notes

References

.
AAHS journal, Volume 42. American Aviation Historical Society. 1997.

"Cutaway Drawing of Burnelli transport in flight" Popular Mechanics, December 1930

CB-16
1920s United States airliners
Lifting bodies
High-wing aircraft
Aircraft first flown in 1929
Twin piston-engined tractor aircraft